Hilde Grythe (born 18 July 1955) is a Norwegian actress.

Grythe was born in Oslo to actress and stage director Kirsten Sørlie and television personality Odd Grythe, and is married to violinist Terje Tønnesen. She was appointed at the Molde theatre Teatret Vårt, Nationaltheatret and Fjernsynsteatret, and eventually worked as freelancer.

Her artistic breakthrough came in 1988 as Hippolyta in an adaptation of A Midsummer Night's Dream at Rogaland Teater. She has played the title role in Knut Hamsun's Viktoria at Nordland Teater, as well as "Nora" in A Doll's House, and "Alexandra" in a stage adaptation of Dostoevsky's novel The Idiot. Her films include Drømmeslottet (1986),  (1986) and North Star (1996).

References

External links
 

1955 births
Living people
Norwegian stage actresses
Norwegian film actresses
Norwegian television actresses
20th-century Norwegian actresses
21st-century Norwegian actresses
Actresses from Oslo